Alamo Methodist Church is a historic Methodist church building at 1150 S. Alamo Street in San Antonio, Texas.

It was built in 1912 in a Mission/Spanish Revival style. The building was added to the National Register of Historic Places in 1979.

References

Methodist churches in Texas
Churches completed in 1912
20th-century Methodist church buildings in the United States
Churches on the National Register of Historic Places in Texas
Churches in San Antonio
National Register of Historic Places in San Antonio
1912 establishments in Texas